Nadig may refer to

 First name
 Nadig Kruttika (born 1988), Indian chess player

 Surname
 Friederike Nadig (1897–1970), German politician
 Marie-Theres Nadig (born 1954), Swiss alpine skier
 Sumatheendra R. Nadig (born 1935), Indian poet